Arthur Saxon (April 28, 1878 – August 6, 1921), born Arthur Hennig and nicknamed "The Iron-Master", was a German strongman and circus performer from the late 19th century into the early 20th century. Saxon is best known for the bent press, a lift in which he was far superior to any other strongman, setting a world record of 168 kg (370 lb) which remains unbroken to this day. He also lifted 175.1 kg (386 lb) informally in a gym, as well as making a "two hands anyhow" lift of 203 kg (448 lb).

Career 

Arno Patschke, known as Arno Saxon on stage, a performer and former Greco-Roman wrestler from Germany was eager to make money performing strongman acts. He traveled to Leipzig, where he convinced Oscard Hilgenfeldt and Arthur Hennig to join him in creating the "Greatest Strong Show" in the country.

Eventually Arthur's two brothers, Kurt and Hermann joined the group as well, forming the "Saxon Trio," and in 1897, the Trio began performing for a circus in Europe. In one act, Arthur Saxon lifted his seated brothers on a barbell with one arm. Another popular portion of their performances included opening the stage to anyone who challenged the validity of a lift, to try for themselves.

At one point during a bent press performance Saxon claimed the act could not be repeated by the famous Eugen Sandow. Unbeknownst to Saxon, on February 26, 1898, Sandow, in the audience at the time, accepted the challenge. Sandow was unable to replicate the lift and, in retaliation, took the Saxon Trio to court. In the case Sandow won with a ruling that he had "handled the bell in exactly the same bodily attitude as Arthur", the judge not fully understanding the lift.

Personal Records

Saxon recorded several of his personal records in his books "The Development of Physical Power" and "The Text Book of Weightlifting".

Bent Press - 386 lb (175.1 kg) - Current unofficial world record

Arthur Lift - 386 lb (175.1 kg) - Current unofficial world record

Pullover And Push Lift - 386 lb (175.1 kg)

Two Hands Anyhow - 448 lb (203 kg) - Current official world record

One-Hand Snatch - 200 lb (90 kg)

Two-Hand Military Press - 252 lb (114 kg)

One-Hand Military Press - 126 lb (57 kg)

Behind-The-Neck Jerk - 311 lb (141 kg)

Clean and jerk - 342 lb (155 kg)

One-Hand Clean and Jerk - 247½ lb (112 kg)

Publications 

In 1905, Saxon published The Development of Physical Power, which explains his methods for performing lifts including the usage of barbells, dumbbells, and kettlebells, as well as Ring, Ball and Square lifting. This book also depicts Saxon displaying the lifts in 45 pages of photographs.

Saxon's The Text Book of Weight-Lifting, published in 1910, includes some psychological explanation of lifting, rather than strict routine. He explains several lifts, such as the famous bent press and continental lifts.

Death 
While Saxon was exempt for service in World War I, he nonetheless suffered from malnutrition due to food shortages in Germany, even as he continued his strongman act in Scandinavia. After the war he tried to continue his strongman act, which conflicted with his unhealthy condition. He grew weaker and developed tuberculosis. Saxon eventually developed pneumonia, causing his death on August 6, 1921, at age 43. His occupation at the time, as recorded on his death certificate, was as a stonemason.

References 
Arthur Saxon and the Saxon Trio
Arthur Saxon Bent Press Development of Physical Power

1878 births
1921 deaths
Circus strongmen and strongwomen
German strength athletes
Sportspeople from Leipzig
People associated with physical culture